The African Game is a live album by George Russell released on the Blue Note label in 1984, featuring performances by Russell with his Living Time Orchestra recorded in 1983 in Boston. The Allmusic review by Richard S. Ginell awarded the album 3 stars and states "The African Game is a major statement, a highly eclectic, nine-part, 45-minute suite for augmented big band that attempts to depict no less than the evolution of the species from the beginning of time to the present from an African perspective. Well, yes, this theme has been taken on by many an ambitious artist in every field, but Russell's work is remarkably successful because it tries to embrace a massive world of sound in open, colorful, young-thinking terms, with degrees of timbral unity and emotion to keep the idioms from flying out of control".

Track listing 
All compositions by George Russell
 "Event I: Organic Life on Earth Begins" - 6:38  
 "Event II: The Paleolithic Game" - 4:32  
 "Event III: Consciousness" - 2:22  
 "Event IV: The Survival Game" - 7:45  
 "Event V: The Human Sensing of Unity with Nature" -   0:50  
 "Event VI: African Empires" - 8:23  
 "Event VII: Cartesian Man" - 3:28  
 "Event VIII: The Mega-Minimalist Age" - 4:04  
 "Event IX: The Future?" - 7:18
 Recorded live at Emmanuel Church, Boston, Massachusetts, June 18, 1983.

Personnel 
 George Russell - conductor, arranger
 Marc Rossi, Bruce Barth - keyboards    
 George Garzone - tenor saxophone, soprano saxophone
 Gary Joynes - tenor saxophone, soprano saxophone, flute
 Dave Mann - alto saxophone, soprano saxophone, flute
 Janis Steprans - alto saxophone, soprano saxophone, flute
 Brad Jones - baritone saxophone, bass clarinet, flute
 Mike Peipman, Chris Passin, Roy Okutani, Mark Harvey - trumpet  
 Peter Cirelli, Chip Kaner - trombone  
 Jeff Marsanskas - bass trombone  
 Marshall Sealy - french horn  
 Mark White - guitar  
 Bob Nieske - acoustic bass  
 Bill Urmson - fender bass  
 Keith Copeland - drums  
 Dave Hagedorn - percussion
 Olu Bata: Joe Galeota, Lazaro Perez, Kuto Perez, Amaro Laria, Enrique Cardenas - African drums

References 

George Russell (composer) live albums
1984 live albums
Blue Note Records live albums